Rai Daljit Singh (around 1798) was ruler of Bhadri of Bisen clan of Rajput, succeeded his father Rai Jit Singh. In 1798 the Nazim Mirza Jan visited Bhadri; he questioned the Rai Daljit Singh about his revenue, with a view to revision, and a quarrel ensued, in which the Rai Daljit Singh was killed. Later his son, Rai Zalim Singh, was thrown into prison in 1810 at Lucknow for non payment of the revenue and the property was taken under direct management The Bhadri taluqa was well managed by Sarabjit Singh, who left it practically unencumbered. Later estate was ruled by Rai Krishna Pratap Singh.

See also 
 Pratapgarh Estate
 Bhadri

References

People from Pratapgarh, Uttar Pradesh
Indian royalty
1798 deaths
Year of birth unknown